Forbach is a village and municipality in Baden-Württemberg, Germany. It lies in the district of Rastatt. It is located in the Murg river valley, in the northern part of the Black Forest mountains.  Forbach is further broken down into the following districts: Langenbrand, Bermersbach, Gausbach, Hundsbach, Herrenwies, Kirschbaumwasen, Erbersbronn, Raumünzach and Schwarzenbach.

The tarn of Schurmsee lies within the municipality at a height of 794 metres.

Mayors
 1998-2014: Kuno Kußmann (CDU)
 since 2014: Katrin Buhrke (lawyer)

Personalities 

 Günther Becker (1924-2007), composer
 Manfred Gotta (born 1947), entrepreneur and advertising editor, lives in Forbach-Hundsbach

References

Rastatt (district)